ITCHY (formerly Itchy Poopzkid) is a German punk rock band formed in 2001. The group consists of Sebastian Hafner (vocals, guitar, bass), Daniel Friedl (vocals, guitar, bass) and Max Zimmer (drums).

They have released seven albums, all of which entered the official German Charts (the sixth record "Six" debuted at #5), started their own record label and played more than 900 shows throughout Europe. Up until the release of their single "Nothing" in April 2017, they toured under the name of "Itchy Poopzkid".

On 21 July 2017, the band released their 7th studio album All We Know and they embarked on a big tour through various countries.

On 15 November 2019, Itchy released a new single and music video Faust from their 8th album Ja Als Ob which was released in 2020.

Discography
 Studio albums
 2005: Heart to Believe
 2007: Time to Ignite
 2009: Dead Serious
 2011: Lights Out London
 2013: Ports & Chords
 2015: Six
 2017: All We Know
 2020: Ja als ob

 Live albums
 2004: Fuck-Ups ... Live!

 EPs
 2001: Two Thumbs Down (Demo)
 2003: ... Having a Time!

 Singles
 2005: Say No
 2007: Silence Is Killing Me
 2007: And I'll Walk Away
 2007: You Don't Bring Me Down
 2009: The Living
 2009: Pretty Me
 2009: The Lottery
 2011: Why Still Bother
 2011: Down Down Down
 2011: It's Tricky (Run DMC Cover)
 2012: We Say So
 2013: I Believe
 2013: The Pirate Song (feat. Guido (Donots))
 2013: Tonight
 2014: Out There
 2015: Dancing in the Sun
 2015: Kings & Queens
 2017: Nothing
 2017: Keep It Real
 2017: Fall Apart

External links
 Official website

German punk rock groups
Musical groups established in 2001